Phleum phleoides (common names: Boehmer's cat's-tail and purple-stem cat's-tail) is a perennial grass native to most of Europe, North Africa, and temperate Asia.

It can be confused with related species Timothy-grass, Phleum pratense. However purple-stem cat's-tail prefers lighter soils and grows on chalk downland.

References

External links

Pooideae
Grasses of Africa
Grasses of Asia
Grasses of Europe
Flora of North Africa
Flora of temperate Asia